The Ludwig Psalter is an illuminated psalter produced between about 825 and 850 at the Abbey of Saint Bertin. It was made for a King Louis, generally thought to be Louis the German, although Louis the Pious has also been suggested. It is illustrated in the Franco-Saxon style and probably served as Louis's private prayer book. Although kept for a time at the Abbey of Fulda, it is now in the Berlin State Library (shelfmark Theol. lat. fol. 58).

At a later date, a "Prayer to Be Recited Before the Cross" was added to some blank pages at the end (folios 119r–v) of the psalter, along with an illustration of a king before the cross (folio 120r). The style is very similar to that of Otfrid of Wissembourg's Liber evangeliorum, and was probably made about the same time (between 863 and 871) by the same illustrator at Wissembourg Abbey. Eric Goldberg associates it with Louis the German's illness in 869, and interprets the king in the illustration as Louis. Simon MacLean, on the other hand, believes the year was 873 and the king Louis's son, Charles the Fat.


See also
List of key works of Carolingian illumination

Notes

Bibliography

External links
Digitized manuscript

9th-century illuminated manuscripts
Carolingian psalters